Jason Willett is an American musician, known largely for his work with experimental rock groups including Half Japanese, Can Openers, Pleasant Livers, X-Ray Eyes, The Dramatics (Martha Colburn and Jason Willett), The Jaunties, The Attitude Robots, Leprechaun Catering, and many more. His current projects are: Half Japanese, Period Bomb, Matmos, Spacience, Leprechaun Catering, and continues to put out new material in collaboration with Jac Berrocal and David Fenech.

His record label, Megaphone, initially set out to issue work by performers such as The Work, Fred Frith, the Molecules, Matmos, David Liebe Hart, Tim Hodgkinson and Jac Berrocal, but became largely a venue for Willett's own collaborative music. He has also made records &/or performed with Ruins, Jac Berrocal, R Stevie Moore, James Chance, Matmos, Hanna Olivegren, Jon Rose, Michael Evans, Ron Anderson, Benb Gallaher, Mick Hobbs, Chris Cutler, Mu Mesons (not the other band, mu meson), Little Howlin Wolf, Yamatsuka Eye and his various pet ducks.

The son of songwriter Fangette Willett (whose work included Tammy St. John's "Dark Shadows and Empty Hallways" and Walter Jackson's "It's an Uphill Climb to the Bottom"), Jason Willett was raised in a musical household in Maryland.  After being drafted as bassist for Half Japanese in 1990, he has retained a collaborative relationship with Jad Fair, with whom he has produced 14 collaborative duo releases (at least 2000 songs still unreleased).

He has operated The True Vine record shop out of Baltimore's Hampden neighborhood for about a dozen years now, but has recently had to move it to Baltimore's Station North neighborhood.

Discography
Green Exist (Cassette) 1987
Jason Willett {7-inch EP} (Unpunk) 1992
Jason Willett, Jad Fair & Gilles Reider {CD} (Megaphone) 1993
The Jaunties {Triple 7-inch Box Set} (Stomach Ache) 1994
The Dramatics {CD} (Megaphone Limited) 1994
The Can Openers {CD} (Megaphone Limited) 1995
The Jaunties: Asthma {CD} (Megaphone Limited) 1995
The Pleasant Livers: From The Land Of Pleasant Living {CD} (Megaphone Limited) 1995
The Dentures: 40,000 Warriors {CD} (Megaphone Limited) 1995
The Attitude Robots {CD} (Megaphone Limited) 1995
The Jaunties: Myoclonic Twitch In The Key Of H {CD} (Megaphone Limited) 1995
X-Ray Eyes {CD} (Megaphone Limited) 1995
The Dramatics: This Is International Telecom {CD} (Megaphone Limited) 1995
The Dramatics: This Is International Telecom {LP} (Lissy's) 1995
Jason Willett & Ruins {CD} (Megaphone Limited) 1995
Half Japanese: Hot {CD} (Safehouse 1995)
Half Japanese: Hot {LP} (Safe House 1995)
The Can Openers: Sherbet {CD} (Megaphone Limited) 1996
Jad Fair & Jason Willett: Honeybee {CD} (Dr. Jim's 1997)
Jad Fair & Jason Willett - The Corpse Is Missing {7" Inside Book} (Slab-O-Concrete 1996)
Jad Fair & Jason Willett: Punk Rock 1996 {7" EP} (Chlorophyl 1996)
The Attitude Robots: Iron On T-shirt {CD} (Megaphone Limited) 1996
The Dentures: 10-inch Voice {CD} (Megaphone Limited) 1996
The Dramatics: Hypnotist Geese CD (Megaphone Limited) 1996
The Dramatics: Garbage For Your Gut {Triple 7-inch Box Set}
Jason Willett & Jad Fair: It's All Good CD (Megaphone Limited) 1996
Jac Berrocal: Non Connexion {7-inch EP} (Megaphone 1996)
Vince Taylor: Rock N' Roll Station {7-inch} (Megaphone 1996)
X-Ray Eyes: Bonemeal CD (Megaphone Limited) 1997
Jad Fair & Jason Willett: The Mighty Superheroes {CD} (Marginal 1997)
Jad Fair & Jason Willett: Wonderful World {Triple Cassette Box} (Shrimper 1997)
Jason Willett & Jad Fair: Twister {LP} (Dark Beloved Cloud 1997)
The Jaunties: Yes Lord! CD (Megaphone Limited) 1997
The Attitude Robots: Kings CD (Megaphone Limited) 1998
Jad Fair & Jason Willett: Wild CD (Megaphone Limited) 1998
Jad Fair & Jason Willett: Enjoyable Songs {CD} (Alternative Tentacles 1998)
Jad Fair & Jason Willett: Enjoyable Songs {LP} (Alternative Tentacles 1998)
Jason Willett & Jad Fair: We're Going To The Moon CD (Megaphone Limited) 1998
Jad Fair & Jason Willett: The Mighty Hypnotic Eye {CD} (Dr. Jim's 1999)
Half Japanese: Hello {CD} (Alternative Tentacles 2001)
Half Japanese: Hello {LP} (Alternative Tentacles 2001)
Jad Fair & Jason Willett: The Attack Of Everything {CD Inside Book} (Slab-O-Concrete 2002)
Jason Willett & Ron Anderson: Be The First On The Block To Eat The Snake {CD} (Ra Sounds 2003)
Jad Fair & Jason Willett: Superfine {CD} (Public Eyesore 2004)
Leprechaun Catering: Kumquats, Lychees {LP} (Ehse 2004)
Leprechaun Catering: Male Plumage {LP} (White Denim 2006)
The Pleasant Livers: From The Land Of Pleasant Living {CD} (Megaphone Limited 2007)
Jason Willett: The Sounds Of Megaphone Limited (CD) (Mt6 2008)
The Can Openers: Is The One (CD) (Megaphone Limited 2008)
Jason Willett: Late Night Moisturizer (7-inch split w/ Jason Urick) (Wildfire Wildfire 2010)
Instant Coffee!: s/t (LP) (Planam 2010)
Jason Willett: Something's Going On.... (Cassette) (Player Press) (2014)
Half Japanese: Overjoyed (LP) (Joyful Noise) (2014)
Bottomless Up: s/t (Cassette) (A Megaphone Cassette Special) (2015)
Half Japanese: Bingo Ringo (EP) (Joyful Noise) (2015)
Half Japanese: Perfect {LP} (2017, Joyful Noise)
Half Japanese: Perfect {CD} (2017, Joyful Noise)
Jad Fair & Jason Willett - The Greatest Power {LP}(Dymaxion Groove) (2015)
Half Japanese: Hear The Lions Roar {LP} (2017, Fire)
Half Japanese: Hear The Lions Roar {CD} (2017, Fire)
I Said No Doctors! {LP}(2017, Dymaxion Groove)
Half Japanese: why not? {LP} (2018, Fire)
Half Japanese: why not? {CD} (2018, Fire)
David Liebe Hart Meets Jad Fair & Jason Willett: For Everyone {LP} (2018, Joyful Noise)
David Liebe Hart Meets Jad Fair & Jason Willett: For Everyone {Cassette} (2019, Burger)
Half Japanese: Invincible {LP} (2019, Fire)
Half Japanese: Invincible {CD} (2019, Fire)
Jac Berrocal, Jason Willett, David Fenech : Xmas in March {LP, CD} (2020, Megaphone + Knock Em Dead Records)

External links
megaphonerecords.com
The True Vine Record Shop

Living people
American multi-instrumentalists
American experimental musicians
American audio engineers
Record producers from Maryland
Year of birth missing (living people)